Susannah Israel (born 1954, in New York City) is an American contemporary artist, writer and composer living in east Oakland, California. She moved to the Bay Area as a young parent in 1976. Her recognizable figures are highly expressive, and serve as visual extensions of her critical and allegorical narratives. Israel has published writing from 2000–present and musical compositions since 2013.

Personal life
Israel and her husband, scientist and composer Ted King (Philadelphia, PA 1945-2001) met in the mid 70's, in San Francisco. They lived with their two daughters in the Mission district, Noe Valley, and the heart of their community was the Castro. In 1996 they moved across the Bay to the Vulcan Foundry Studios, a labyrinthine warehouse complex in Oakland, California. During the year 2001 Israel suffered two personal tragedies as first her mother, and then her husband died from cancer. Israel took a step back from making art during this time, but eventually returned with sculptures that are deeply reflective, and even richer with layered narrative.

Israel met her partner Bill Lassell (1965-2009, Lafayette, CA) through the Vulcan community, where they organized art, writing and community events together before falling in love and beginning an eight-year creative partnership. Lassell was a documentary filmmaker with a degree in sociology, a video camera and a keen intellect; he filmed at Archie Bray Foundation for the Ceramic Arts in Montana, Boise State in Idaho, College of Marin, Mendocino College, Sonoma Art Center, Richmond Art Center and many more, as the couple traveled the invitational lecture circuit.

For Israel, Bill Lassell's sudden, unexpected death, though peaceful, was a devastating blow. Through grief and recovery, she was sustained by attending music rehearsal in the warehouse, and in 2011 she began playing and composing on keyboards.

Education 
Israel graduated from a high school in the small village of Wappingers Falls, New York where she was awarded the Regents Honors Scholarship to Pratt Art Institute in New York City in 1972. In 1980, the artist completed the paramedic/EMT program at San Francisco General Hospital, and became one of the first three women paramedics in the City and County of San Francisco. A few years later, from 1983–1987, Israel attended San Francisco State University earning a Bachelor of Arts degree in Art & Chemistry, and then returned in 1997 to acquire her Master of Fine Arts degree in 2000. While there, she studied with (among others) Stephen de Staebler, Joe Hawley, Candace Crockett, Paul Pratchenko, David Kuraoka, Paula Levine and Kathleen Hanna.

Teaching career 
In the early 1970s, Israel began teaching art and ceramics. She created a ceramic arts program at the Cleveland Friends School, in Cleveland, Ohio, and taught there from 1973–1974. After moving to San Francisco in 1976, she worked with the Rainbow Collective Childcare Group, teaching art to children at Honey Sandwich.

In Fall 2000, Israel served as a one-term, full-time Sculpture and Ceramics teacher at California State University, Bakersfield. From 2002- 2018, she taught Ceramics and Sculpture at Laney College, where she also served as Art Department co-Chair; Israel taught Art History and Ceramic Sculpture at Merritt College from 2003–2018. Israel received a Distinguished faculty Service Award for her teaching as an adjunct Professor of Art at the Contra Costa Colleges from 2002–2006.

Fellowships, residencies, and collectives 
After graduating from San Francisco State University, Israel joined the Ruby's Clay Studio Collective in San Francisco from 1987–90. In 1990 she was accepted as artist in residence at the Doelger Art Center, by Daly City from 1990–95. There she had an 1800 ft. studio, allowing her to push the direction and possibilities for her clay sculpture. The artist received critical attention and support in awards, grants, and exhibitions: a Virginia Groot Foundation Award, 1989; a show with the Korean Embassy Art Program in Los Angeles, 1996; the 7th Sculptor On Campus, CSU Bakersfield, 1994, and Resident Artist at Serramonte Del Rey High School, Fall 1994. Israel is the only artist from the US to receive the prestigious International Fletcher Challenge Premier Award. Her winning entry, Lobo California, is in the collection of the Auckland Museum, New Zealand. (Auckland Museum Tāmaki Paenga Hira, New Zealand).
https://www.aucklandmuseum.com/discover/research/crafting-aotearoa/the-fletcher-challenge-ceramic-awards

Collections

Public and sited work 

Archie Bray Foundation for the Ceramic Arts, Helena, Montana  Archie Bray Foundation for the Ceramic Arts
Auckland Memorial Museum, New Zealand. Auckland War Memorial Museum
California State University at Bakersfield, California  
Gladding, McBean Historic Collection   Lincoln, California  Gladding, McBean
Madison Public Library, Wisconsin 
The Mint Museum of Craft & Design, American Ceramics Collection  Mint Museum
Mission Clay Products, Corona, California, Phoenix, Arizona and Pittsburg, Kansas 
City of Moraga Art In Public Spaces. Moraga California 
Ocotillo School in Tucson, Arizona 
Orinda Public Art Program, Orinda Library, California 
San Angelo Museum of Fine Arts, San Angelo Texas
The Sculptor's Dominion, San Antonio, Texas

References

 Israel, Susannah. Sustaining the Creative Spirit. vol. 39, 2010.
Levin, Elaine, The Art of Making Art, "Vision," AJU Journal V. 9 Winter 2010, pp 7–9
 Reid, Giles. 1997 Fletcher Challenge Award. vol. 45, American Ceramic Society, Columbus, 1997.
 Rich, Chris, and Val M. Cushing. The Ceramic Design Book: a Gallery of Contemporary Work. Asheville, NC: Lark Books, 1998.

External links
https://www.aucklandmuseum.com/discover/research/crafting-aotearoa/the-fletcher-challenge-ceramic-awards
SUSANNAH ISRAEL

Art Critic and Ceramics Professor Susannah Israel
Susannah Israel
Susannah Israel
KGPC Interviews & Docs
Susannah Israel
The whimsical creations of award-winning California clay artist, Susannah Israel

American ceramists
1954 births
Living people
20th-century American ceramists
San Francisco State University alumni
21st-century ceramists
21st-century American women artists
American women academics
20th-century American women